Christopher Meneses Barrantes (born May 2, 1990) is a Costa Rican professional footballer who plays as a defender for Sporting San José.

Club career
Meneses came through the youth ranks of Alajuelense for whom he made his senior debut in 2008. In summer 2013 he joined Swedish side IFK Norrköping. After a year and a half with Norrköping they declared in April 2015 that Meneses was free to leave the club after they had reached an agreement that he needed to restart his career somewhere else. In 2015, he returned to Liga Deportiva Alajuelense.

On 13 December 2021, Meneses signed with Sporting San José.

International career
Meneses made his debut for Costa Rica in an August 2010 friendly match against Paraguay and has, as of May 2014, earned a total of 15 caps, scoring no goals. He represented his country in 2 FIFA World Cup qualification matches and played at the 2013 Copa Centroamericana and the 2013 CONCACAF Gold Cup.

References

External links
 
 Profile - Norrköping

1990 births
Living people
Association football defenders
Costa Rican footballers
Costa Rica international footballers
2013 Copa Centroamericana players
2013 CONCACAF Gold Cup players
2014 Copa Centroamericana players
2017 Copa Centroamericana players
L.D. Alajuelense footballers
Liga FPD players
IFK Norrköping players
Allsvenskan players
Santos de Guápiles footballers
Costa Rican expatriate footballers
Expatriate footballers in Sweden
Costa Rican expatriate sportspeople in Sweden
Copa Centroamericana-winning players